The 2008–09 Rutgers Scarlet Knights men's basketball represented Rutgers University in the 2008–09 NCAA Division I men's basketball season. The head coach was Fred Hill, then in his 3rd season with the Scarlet Knights. The team played its home games in Louis Brown Athletic Center in Piscataway Township, New Jersey, and is a member of the Big East Conference. The Scarlet Knights finished 15th in the conference's regular season, and were defeated in the first round in the Big East tournament, falling to Notre Dame 61–50.

Preseason

Recruiting

Roster

Schedule and results

|-
!colspan=9| Exhibition

|-
!colspan=9| Regular season

|-
!colspan=9| Big East tournament

References 

Rutgers
Rutgers Scarlet Knights men's basketball seasons
2008 in sports in New Jersey
2009 in sports in New Jersey